Micromonospora gifhornensis is a Gram-positive bacterium from the genus Micromonospora. It is Gram-positive, aerobic and spore-forming.

References

Further reading

External links

LPSN
Type strain of Verrucosispora gifhornensis at BacDive -  the Bacterial Diversity Metadatabase

Micromonosporaceae
Bacteria described in 1998